Basavana Bagevadi Assembly seat is one of 224 assembly constituencies in Karnataka State, in India. It is part of Bijapur (Lok Sabha constituency).

Assembly Members

Bombay State (Hippargi Bagewadi Constituency)
 1951: Shankargouda Yashwantgouda Patil, Indian National Congress

Mysore State (Bagewadi Constituency)
 1957: Sushilabai Hirachand Shah, Indian National Congress

 1962: Sushilabai Hirachand Shah, Indian National Congress

 1967: P. B. Somanagouda, Indian National Congress

 1972: B. S. Patil, Indian National Congress (Organisation)

Karnataka State (Basavana Bagevadi Constituency)

Also see
List of constituencies of the Karnataka Legislative Assembly

References

Assembly constituencies of Karnataka
Bijapur district, Karnataka